In Greek mythology, Eurydice  (/jʊəˈrɪdɪsi/; Ancient Greek: Εὐρυδίκη , Eurydikē "wide justice", derived from ευρυς eurys "wide" and δικη dike "justice") was a Spartan princess who later on became the queen of Argos.

Mythology 
Eurydice was the daughter of King Lacedaemon and Queen Sparta, the legendary founders of Sparta and thus sister to Amyclas. 

Later on, Eurydice married King Acrisius of Argos and became the mother of Danaë who begot the celebrated hero Perseus. Her other daughter was possibly Evarete, wife of Oenomaus, king of Pisa in Elis. In some accounts, the wife of Acrisius was called Aganippe.

Argive genealogy

Notes

References
Gaius Julius Hyginus, Fabulae from The Myths of Hyginus translated and edited by Mary Grant. University of Kansas Publications in Humanistic Studies. Online version at the Topos Text Project.
Grimal, Pierre, The Dictionary of Classical Mythology, Wiley-Blackwell, 1996, . "Eurydice" (2), p. 157.
Pseudo-Apollodorus, The Library with an English Translation by Sir James George Frazer, F.B.A., F.R.S. in 2 Volumes, Cambridge, MA, Harvard University Press; London, William Heinemann Ltd. 1921. Online version at the Perseus Digital Library. Greek text available from the same website.

Spartan princesses
Princesses in Greek mythology
Queens in Greek mythology
Laconian characters in Greek mythology
Laconian mythology
Mythology of Argos